General elections were held in Sweden on 22 September 1899. The Lantmanna Party received a majority of the vote.  Erik Gustaf Boström remained Prime Minister.

Campaign
The Liberals and the Swedish Social Democratic Party ran joint lists in some constituencies.

Results
Only 25.4% of the male population aged over 21 was eligible to vote. Voter turnout was 40.3%.

References

Sweden
General
General elections in Sweden
Sweden